Pavel Koutecký (June 10, 1956 – April 13, 2006) was a Czech documentary film director.

Koutecký was born in Prague, Czechoslovakia, and graduated from FAMU in 1982. He died in an accidental fall from a tall building under construction in the Pankrác area of Prague while preparing a documentary about the risks taken by people who climb skyscrapers.

References

External links

Accidental deaths from falls
Czech film directors
Czech documentary filmmakers
1956 births
2006 deaths
Accidental deaths in the Czech Republic